Kord Gheshlaghi (also Romanized asknown as Kord Gheshlāgh) is a village in Qarbi Rural District, in the Central District of Ardabil County, Ardabil Province, Iran. At the 2006 census, its population was 405, in 89 families.

References 

Towns and villages in Ardabil County